Vineland Boys is a street gang composed mainly of Hispanic Americans operating in the San Fernando Valley area of Los Angeles.

History 
The Vineland Boys gang was founded in North Hollywood, Los Angeles in January 1988 by former members and associates of the 18th Street gang. It was named after Vineland Avenue in North Hollywood where members would play football. In addition to 18th Street, the Vineland Boys also clashed with the Mexican Mafia until the gang's founder Teddy Lopez was murdered by Mexican Mafia members at a Monterey Park nightclub in 1998. The Vineland boys have since joined the Mexican Mafia-controlled Sureño gang coalition. The gang has approximately 300 members and operates in the San Fernando Valley. The Vineland Boys have formed alliances with Armenian Power and the Abergil crime family. The gang allegedly first teamed up with Abergils in 2000, offering protection and cooperation to the Israeli mafia's ecstasy trafficking ring operating in their territory.

In 2003, members of the Vineland Boyz gang fatally shot Burbank Police Officer Matthew Pavelka. This prompted a massive response where 1,300 federal and local law enforcement members took part in "Operation Silent Night". It resulted in 23 arrests of Vineland Boyz gang members.

On February 13, 2019 the Vineland Boyz gang was targeted again by federal agents. Over three dozen associates were arrested in the raids.

References 

Organizations established in 1988
1988 establishments in California
Sureños
Latino street gangs
Gangs in Los Angeles
Mexican-American culture in Los Angeles
North Hollywood, Los Angeles